The Masonic Temple Building, built in 1907, is an historic Prince Hall Masonic building located at 427 South Blount Street in Raleigh, North Carolina.  It is a three-story, red brick flat roofed building.  It has a metal cornice at the top of the first floor level and a cast iron Corinthian order column at the corner. On May 3, 1984, it was added to the National Register of Historic Places.

Today it is occupied by Widow's Son Lodge #4 and Excelsior Lodge #21 as well as barber shops and a beauty salon.

It is one of two places of the same name in Raleigh on the National Register of Historic Places, the other being the much larger Masonic Temple Building, Fayetteville Street (Raleigh, North Carolina), which was also built in 1907.

See also
 Prince Hall Freemasonry

References

External links
 Most Worshipful Prince Hall Grand Lodge of North Carolina website

African-American history in Raleigh, North Carolina
Masonic buildings in North Carolina
Prince Hall Masonic buildings in the United States
Clubhouses on the National Register of Historic Places in North Carolina
Masonic buildings completed in 1907
Buildings and structures in Raleigh, North Carolina
National Register of Historic Places in Raleigh, North Carolina